In gastronomy, red meat is commonly red when raw and a dark color after it is cooked, in contrast to white meat, which is pale in color before and after cooking. In culinary terms, only flesh from mammals or fowl (not fish) is classified as red or white. In nutritional science, red meat is defined as any meat that has more of the protein myoglobin than white meat. White meat is defined as non-dark meat from fish or chicken (excluding the leg or thigh).

Definition

Under the culinary definition, the meat from adult or "gamey" mammals (for example, beef, horse meat, mutton, venison, boar, hare) is red meat, while that from young mammals (rabbit, veal, lamb) is white. Poultry is white. Most cuts of pork are red, others are white. Game is sometimes put in a separate category altogether. (French: viandes noires — "dark meats".) Some meats (lamb, pork) are classified differently by different writers.

According to the United States Department of Agriculture (USDA), all meats obtained from mammals (regardless of cut or age) are red meats because they contain more myoglobin than fish or white meat (but not necessarily dark meat) from chicken. Some cuts of pork are considered white under the culinary definition, but all pork is considered red meat in nutritional studies. The National Pork Board has positioned it as "the other white meat", profiting from the ambiguity to suggest that pork has the nutritional properties of white meat, which is considered more healthful.

Nutrition
Red meat contains large amounts of iron, creatine, minerals such as zinc and phosphorus, and B-vitamins: (niacin, vitamin B12, thiamin and riboflavin). Red meat is a source of lipoic acid.

Red meat contains small amounts of vitamin D. Offal such as liver contains much higher quantities than other parts of the animal.

In 2011, the USDA launched MyPlate, which did not distinguish between kinds of meat, but did recommend eating at least  of fish each week. In 2011, the Harvard School of Public Health launched the Healthy Eating Plate in part because of the perceived inadequacies of the USDA's recommendations. The Healthy Eating Plate encourages consumers to avoid processed meat and limit red meat consumption to twice a week because of links to heart disease, diabetes, and colon cancer. To replace these meats it recommends consuming fish, poultry, beans, or nuts.

Health effects

Overall, diets high in red and processed meats are associated with an increased risk of diabetes, cardiovascular disease, cancer (particularly colorectal cancer), and all-cause mortality. These associations are strongest for processed meat, which is meat that has undergone salting, curing, fermentation, smoking, or other processes to enhance flavor or improve preservation, such as bacon, ham, salami, pepperoni, hot dogs, and some sausages.

A 2021 umbrella review that sees an increase of 11–51% risk of multiple cancer per 100g/d increment of red meat, and an increase of 8-72% risk of multiple cancer per 50g/d increment of processed meat.

A 2022 study challenged the dose-response relationship using a newly developed burden of proof risk function (BPRF). It found weak evidence available regarding whether eating red meat increases the risk of death. The authors conclude that the quality of the available evidence is insufficient to make stronger or more conclusive recommendations regarding the health effects of eating red meat. However the BPRF approach has been criticised for being overly simplistic.

Cancer
The International Agency for Research on Cancer (IARC) of the World Health Organization (WHO) classifies processed meat as carcinogenic to humans (Group 1), based on "sufficient evidence in humans that the consumption of processed meat causes colorectal cancer." Unprocessed red meat is categorised as "probably carcinogenic to humans (Group 2A), based on limited evidence that the consumption of red meat causes cancer in humans and strong mechanistic evidence supporting a carcinogenic effect." Positive associations have also been observed between red meat consumption and increased risks of pancreatic cancer and prostate cancer but the link is not as clear.

The American Institute for Cancer Research, Cancer Research UK and World Cancer Research Fund International have stated there is strong evidence that consumption of processed red meat is a cause of colorectal cancer and there is probable evidence that unprocessed red meat is a cause of cancer. Put in perspective, in the UK, 56 out of 1000 people who eat the lowest amount of processed meat will develop colorectal cancer (5.6%) while 66 out of 1000 high processed meat eaters will develop colorectal cancer (6.6%).

Mechanisms
Nitrates and nitrites found in processed meat can be converted by the human body into nitrosamines that can be carcinogenic, causing mutation in the colorectal cell line, thereby causing tumorigenesis and eventually leading to cancer. Processed meat is more carcinogenic compared to red meat because of the abundance of potent nitrosyl-heme molecules that form N-nitroso compounds. 

A 2017 literature review indicated there are numerous potential carcinogens of colorectal tissue in red meat, particularly those in processed red meat products, such as N-nitroso compounds, polycyclic aromatic hydrocarbons (PAHs), and heterocyclic amines (HCAs). Cooking meat with "high-temperature methods, such as pan frying or grilling directly over an open flame", also causes formation of PAHs and HCAs.

Cardiovascular disease and stroke

Red meat consumption is associated with an increased risk of coronary heart disease, high blood pressure and stroke, but it is unclear whether the effect is causal. Factors associated with increased stroke risk from consuming red meat include saturated fats that increase levels of blood cholesterol, LDL cholesterol, triglycerides, and heme iron, which may precipitate atherogenesis in cerebral arteries, leading to stroke.

Diabetes
A 2022 umbrella review found that four additional 100g of red meat intake per day, was associated with a 17% increased risk of diabetes.

A 2022 review of randomized control trials found that eating red meat does not increase risk factors for diabetes mellitus. Another review found that eating red meat does not worsen biomarkers of glycemic control or inflammation in adults at risk for cardiometabolic disease.

However, 2017 prospective studies showed that daily consumption of 85 grams of red meat and 35 grams of processed red meat products by European and American consumers increased their risk of type 2 diabetes by 18–36%, while a diet of abstinence of red meat consuming whole grains, vegetables, fruits, and dairy was associated with an 81% reduced risk of diabetes. One study estimated that "substitutions of one serving of nuts, low-fat dairy, and whole grains per day for one serving of red meat per day were associated with a 16–35% lower risk of type 2 diabetes".

References

External links

IARC Group 2A carcinogens
Meat

sv:Kött#Rött och vitt kött